The first season of Chicago P.D. aired on NBC from January 8, 2014, at 10:00 p.m. EST, to May 21, 2014.

Production
On March 27, 2013, it was reported that NBC was considering plans for a spin-off of Chicago Fire. Deadline revealed that the proposed spin-off would involve the Chicago Police Department, and would be created and executive produced by Dick Wolf, Derek Haas, Michael Brandt, and Matt Olmstead.

On May 10, 2013, NBC picked up the proposed spin-off, now titled Chicago P.D., for the 2013–14 United States network television schedule. 

On January 31, 2014, NBC ordered two additional episodes of Chicago P.D., bringing the total number of episodes for the first season to fifteen.

Casting
Tania Raymonde was cast in the planned series as an Officer named Nicole. Kelly Blatz, the lead-actor of Disney XD's Aaron Stone, was also cast as a young but seasoned Officer Elam. Scott Eastwood was set to portray Officer Jim Barnes. Eastwood also co-starred with Tania Raymonde in Texas Chainsaw 3D. Melissa Sagemiller would portray Detective Willhite, a member of the Chicago P.D. Intelligence Unit. LaRoyce Hawkins, in the role of Officer Kevin Atwater, was the only Chicago area actor originally cast in May. These characters were introduced in the penultimate episodes of Chicago Fires first season. 

Sagemiller's character was dropped after her initial guest spot on Chicago Fire and in the first episode of Chicago P.D.. Jesse Lee Soffer, who already had a recurring role on Chicago Fire as undercover cop Detective Jay Halstead, was added to the main cast in her place. Jason Beghe was cast as Sergeant of the Intelligence Unit Hank Voight and Jon Seda would play the role of Intelligence Unit Detective Antonio Dawson. Patrick Flueger and One Tree Hill star Sophia Bush joined the cast as Officer Adam Ruzek and Detective Erin Lindsay respectively. Marina Squerciati joined the cast in the role of Officer Kim Burgess. Elias Koteas became a member of the main cast and would play Intelligence Unit Detective Alvin Olinsky. Archie Kao was later announced to be playing Sheldon Jin, a tech-expert working with the Intelligence Unit. Stella Maeve was cast in the recurring role of playing Nadia, a pretty 18-year-old escort who is addicted to heroin and goes through a very difficult withdrawal. Both Eastwood and Raymonde, like Sagemiller, departed the series and would no longer be a part of the show's main cast. Sydney Tamiia Poitier was to guest star in five episodes as a Detective, who would eventually crossover on to the parent series, Chicago Fire.

Regular
 Jason Beghe as Sergeant Henry "Hank" Voight
 Jon Seda as Detective Antonio Dawson 
 Sophia Bush as Detective Erin Lindsay 
 Jesse Lee Soffer as Detective Jay Halstead
 Patrick John Flueger as Officer Adam Ruzek
 Marina Squerciati as Officer Kim Burgess
 LaRoyce Hawkins as Officer Kevin Atwater
 Archie Kao as Officer Sheldon Jin
 Elias Koteas as Detective Alvin Olinsky

Recurring
 Amy Morton as Desk Sergeant Trudy Platt
 Robert Wisdom as Commander Ron Perry
 Kurt Naebig as Lt. Bruce Belden
 America Olivo as Laura Dawson
 Josh Segarra as Justin Voight
 Robin Weigert as Erica Gradishar
 Emily Peterson as Wendy
 Stella Maeve as Nadia Decotis
 Alina Jenine Taber as Lexi Olinsky
 David Aron Damane as Maurice Owens
 Gabriel Ellis as Gustav Munoz
 Ian Bohen as Sergeant Edwin Stillwell
 Sydney Tamiia Poitier as Detective Mia Sumner
 Arturo Del Puerto as Andres "Pulpo" Diaz
 Matthew Sherbach as Lonnie Rodiger
 Don Forston as Phil Rodiger 
 Billy Wirth as Charlie Pugliese

Crossover characters
 Taylor Kinney as Lieutenant Kelly Severide
 Monica Raymund as Paramedic Gabriela Dawson
 Lauren German as Paramedic Leslie Shay
 David Eigenberg as Firefighter Christopher Herrmann
 Charlie Barnett as Firefighter Peter Mills
 Yuri Sardarov as Firefighter Brian "Otis" Zvonecek
 Jesse Spencer as Lieutenant Matthew Casey
 Eamonn Walker as Battalion Chief Wallace Boden
 Joe Minoso as Firefighter Joe Cruz
 Ice-T as Detective Odafin "Fin" Tutuola
 Kelli Giddish as Detective Amanda Rollins

Episodes

Ratings
The series premiere was watched by 8.59 million viewers and achieved a 2.0/6 Adults 18–49 rating with the DVR ratings reaching 11 million. The season concluded on May 21 with 6.27 million, averaging the first season with 8.03 million viewers per episode.

Live + 7 Day (DVR) ratings

DVD release
The DVD release of season one was released after the season had completed its original television broadcast. The DVD release features bonus material such as audio commentaries on some episodes from the creator and cast, deleted scenes, gag reels and behind-the-scenes featurettes.

References

External links
 
 

2014 American television seasons
Chicago P.D. (TV series) seasons